Frank McGlynn may refer to:
 Frank McGlynn (Gaelic footballer)
 Frank McGlynn Sr., American actor

See also
 Frank McLynn, British author and journalist